Birchgrove railway station is a railway station serving Birchgrove, Cardiff, Wales.

Passenger services are provided by Transport for Wales as part of the Valley Lines network.

It was opened by the Great Western Railway in 1929.

Services
Monday to Saturday daytimes there is a half-hourly service to Cardiff Central southbound (and onwards to  via the City Line) and to Coryton northbound. In the evenings the frequency drops to hourly, whilst there is no Sunday service.

See also
 List of railway stations in Cardiff

References

Sources

External links

Railway stations in Cardiff
DfT Category F2 stations
Former Great Western Railway stations
Railway stations in Great Britain opened in 1929
Railway stations served by Transport for Wales Rail